December 19 - Eastern Orthodox liturgical calendar - December 21

All fixed commemorations below celebrated on January 2 by Orthodox Churches on the Old Calendar.

For December 20th, Orthodox Churches on the Old Calendar commemorate the Saints listed on December 7.

Feasts
 Forefeast of the Nativity of Christ.

Saints
 Hieromartyr Ignatius the God-bearer, Bishop of Antioch (107) (see also January 29 )
 Saint Philogonius, Bishop of Antioch, Confessor (323)
 Saint Paul of Latrus (or Paul of Latra; died c. 956), a Greek hermit.

Pre-Schism Western saints
 Martyrs Liberatus and Bajulus, at Rome.
 Saint Ursicinus of Cahors, Bishop of Cahors in France (ca.585)
 Saint Dominic of Brescia, successor of St Anastasius as Bishop of Brescia in Italy (ca.612)
Saint Ursicinus of Saint-Ursanne, born in Ireland, he was a disciple of St Columbanus, and founded the monastery of St Ursanne (ca.625)

Post-Schism Orthodox saints
 Saint Daniel II, Archbishop of Serbia (1338)
 Saint Ignatius, Archimandrite of the Kiev Caves (1435)
 New Martyr John of the island of Thasos, at Constantinople, by beheading (1652)
 Saint Anthony (Smirnitsky), Archbishop of Voronezh (1846)
 Righteous John of Kronstadt, Wonderworker (1908) (see also October 19 )

New martyrs and confessors
 New Hieromartyr Nikolai Chernishev, Archpriest, of Udmurtia (east of Kazan), and New Martyr Barbara, his daughter (1919)

Other commemorations
 Novgorod Icon of the Theotokos, "Deliverance of the Drowning" ("Rescuer of the Drowning").

Icon gallery

Notes

References

Sources
 December 20/January 2. Orthodox Calendar (PRAVOSLAVIE.RU).
 January 2 / December 20. HOLY TRINITY RUSSIAN ORTHODOX CHURCH (A parish of the Patriarchate of Moscow).
 December 20. OCA - The Lives of the Saints.
 The Autonomous Orthodox Metropolia of Western Europe and the Americas (ROCOR). St. Hilarion Calendar of Saints for the year of our Lord 2004. St. Hilarion Press (Austin, TX). p. 1.
 December 20. Latin Saints of the Orthodox Patriarchate of Rome.
 The Roman Martyrology. Transl. by the Archbishop of Baltimore. Last Edition, According to the Copy Printed at Rome in 1914. Revised Edition, with the Imprimatur of His Eminence Cardinal Gibbons. Baltimore: John Murphy Company, 1916.
Greek Sources
 Great Synaxaristes:  20 ΔΕΚΕΜΒΡΙΟΥ. ΜΕΓΑΣ ΣΥΝΑΞΑΡΙΣΤΗΣ.
  Συναξαριστής. 20 Δεκεμβρίου. ECCLESIA.GR. (H ΕΚΚΛΗΣΙΑ ΤΗΣ ΕΛΛΑΔΟΣ). 
Russian Sources
  2 января (20 декабря). Православная Энциклопедия под редакцией Патриарха Московского и всея Руси Кирилла (электронная версия). (Orthodox Encyclopedia - Pravenc.ru).
  20 декабря (ст.ст.) 2 января 2013 (нов. ст.). Русская Православная Церковь Отдел внешних церковных связей. (DECR).

December in the Eastern Orthodox calendar